Kristan "Kris" Burley (born January 29, 1974 in Truro, Nova Scotia) is a Canadian gymnast, who has represented Canada at the Commonwealth Games, the Pan American Games and the Olympic Games.

Originally from Truro, Nova Scotia, he was based in Richmond Hill, Ontario and Fredericton, New Brunswick during his competitive career.

Competition
He was a competitive athlete from 1989 to 1999, winning four national championships in gymnastics during his career and representing Canada at the World Championships in Gymnastics, the Commonwealth Games, the Pan American Games and the Olympics.

In his first national championship, he won the junior-level all around with 108.1 points to 101.6 for his nearest competitor. He also qualified for several senior-level events despite being just 16 years old at the time, and won the vault and floor events at that level as well. He won the national senior men's all-around in 1995.

Commonwealth Games

At the 1994 Commonwealth Games in Victoria, British Columbia, Burley won three silver medals as a solo competitor in floor, vault and parallel bars. In the men's team event, he was the last floor performer after teammates Alan Nolet, Richard Ikeda and Travis Romagnoli; in what he would later describe as one of the best performances of his life, he scored 9.55 to secure the gold medal for the Canadian team.

At the 1998 Commonwealth Games in Kuala Lumpur, Malaysia, he won a silver medal in the men's horizontal bar, and a bronze medal in the men's team event.

Pan American Games
Burley won two bronze medals as a solo competitor and one bronze medal with the Canadian team at the 1995 Pan American Games in Mar del Plata, Argentina, and one bronze medal at the 1999 Pan American Games in Winnipeg, Manitoba.

Olympics
He competed at the 1996 Summer Olympics in Atlanta, Georgia, but did not win any medals.

Honours
He was named male athlete of the year by Sport New Brunswick in 1997, and by Gymnastics Canada in 1996 and 1998.

Post-competition
Burley announced his retirement from competition in 1999, and subsequently worked as a television production assistant and served on the board of directors of the Association of Canada's National Team Athletes. He worked with Cirque du Soleil for several years as a performer in Alegría and as assistant artistic director of Dralion. He later worked on the communications and media team for Toronto's bid to host the 2015 Pan American Games.

Openly gay, he is also a spokesperson for the Canadian Olympic Committee's program to combat homophobia in sport.

References

Gymnasts at the 1996 Summer Olympics
Olympic gymnasts of Canada
Living people
1974 births
Sportspeople from Nova Scotia
People from Truro, Nova Scotia
LGBT gymnasts
Canadian LGBT sportspeople
Gay sportsmen
Cirque du Soleil performers
Canadian circus performers
Canadian male artistic gymnasts
Gymnasts at the 1994 Commonwealth Games
Commonwealth Games gold medallists for Canada
Commonwealth Games silver medallists for Canada
Commonwealth Games bronze medallists for Canada
Pan American Games bronze medalists for Canada
Commonwealth Games medallists in gymnastics
Pan American Games medalists in gymnastics
Gymnasts at the 1995 Pan American Games
Gymnasts at the 1999 Pan American Games
Medalists at the 1995 Pan American Games
Medallists at the 1994 Commonwealth Games
Canadian gay men